Carmen Beach is a seaside resort in Puntarenas Province, Costa Rica. It consists of a white sand beach, a small coastal town, and some buildings perched on the foothills of the Cabo Blanco . The force of the waves is lower than the neighbouring beaches.

References 

Populated places in San José Province
San José Province